Ashton-under-Lyne by-election may refer to one of five by-elections held in the British House of Commons constituency of Ashton-under-Lyne, in Lancashire:

 1920 Ashton-under-Lyne by-election
 1928 Ashton-under-Lyne by-election
 1931 Ashton-under-Lyne by-election
 1939 Ashton-under-Lyne by-election
 1945 Ashton-under-Lyne by-election

See also
 Ashton-under-Lyne (UK Parliament constituency)